The Hong Kong Economic and Trade Office London is Hong Kong's representation in the United Kingdom. Apart from the United Kingdom, the Office is responsible for fostering trade and economic relations with countries including Denmark, Estonia, Finland, Latvia, Lithuania, Norway, Russia and Sweden. The Office promotes bilateral trade with and investment in Hong Kong, updates the business communities and multiplier organisations on important developments in Hong Kong. It also organizes official visits, seminars and liaison events in the countries concerned, and acts as a hub to support investors from these countries in their search for business opportunities in Hong Kong and mainland China.

The office is located at 18 Bedford Square in the City of Westminster in central London; the building also houses the London office of the London Representative Office of the Hong Kong Trade Development Council and Hong Kong Tourism Board. It was previously located at 6 Grafton Street.

The current Director-General of the office is Winky So, who reports to the Special Representative for Hong Kong Economic & Trade Affairs to the European Union, Brussels ETO.

The Hong Kong Economic and Trade Office Act 1996 confers a number of immunities and privileges on HKETO London either in line with or similar to provisions of the Vienna Convention on Consular Relations afforded or accorded to consulates-general and consulates of high commissions and embassies, consulates-general and consulates, codified in the United Kingdom as the Consular Relations Act 1968.

When Hong Kong was under British administration, the office was known as the Hong Kong Government Office and was headed by a Commissioner.

Apart from the UK, HKETO London is also responsible for maintaining ties with Denmark, Estonia, Finland, Latvia, Lithuania, Norway, Russia and Sweden.

Other European countries fall within the purview of Hong Kong Economic and Trade Office, Brussels and Hong Kong Economic and Trade Office, Berlin.

List of commissioners
Commissioners

 Selwyn Eugene Alleyne (1987–1989)
 John Francis Yaxley (1989–1994)
 David Ford (1994–1997)
Directors-General
John Tsang Chun-wah (1997–1999)
Sandra Birch Lee Suk-yee (1999–2000)
Andrew Leung Kin-pong (2000–2004)
Carrie Lam Cheng Yuet-ngor (2004–2006)
 Sarah Wu Po-chu (2006–2011)
  (2011–2013)
 Erica Ng Lai-man (2013–2015)
 Priscilla To Kit-lai (2015–2018)
Winky So Yuen-ling (2019–2021)
  (2021– )

See also 

Hong Kong Economic and Trade Offices
British Consulate-General, Hong Kong

References

External links
Official website

Hong Kong
Acts of the Parliament of the United Kingdom concerning Hong Kong
China–United Kingdom relations
London
Buildings and structures in the City of Westminster
London